Mangaf is an area in Kuwait, located in the Ahmadi Governorate. It is located east of the Ahmadi area and is on the coast of the Persian Gulf. There is a large concentration of shops and restaurants in an area locally known as Al Azeeziya, which includes a branch of Sultan Center chain. A Hilton Resort can be found on the Mangaf coastline.

Suburbs of Kuwait City